Linovo is a village in the municipality of Babušnica, Serbia. According to the 2002 census, the village has a population of 118 people.

References

 
Populated places in Pirot District